The 1997 IAAF Grand Prix Final was the thirteenth edition of the season-ending competition for the IAAF Grand Prix track and field circuit, organised by the International Association of Athletics Federations. It was held on 13 September at the Hakatanomori Athletic Stadium in Fukuoka City, Japan.

Wilson Kipketer (800 metres) and Astrid Kumbernuss (shot put) were the overall points winners of the tournament. A total of 18 athletics events were contested, ten for men and eight for women.

Medal summary

Men

Women

References
IAAF Grand Prix Final. GBR Athletics. Retrieved on 2015-01-17.

External links
IAAF Grand Prix Final archive from IAAF

Grand Prix Final
Grand Prix Final
International athletics competitions hosted by Japan
Sport in Fukuoka
IAAF Grand Prix Final